The Manchester Academic Health Science Centre (MAHSC) is an academic health science centre based in Manchester, United Kingdom. It is a partnership between the University of Manchester and four NHS organisations in Greater Manchester. It was originally established in June 2008, with re-designation most recently in April 2020 by the National Institute for Health and Care Research (NIHR) and NHS England / NHS Improvement. It is now one of eight academic health science centres in England, designated for excellence in health research, education and patient care.

Health Innovation Manchester

In October 2017, the translational research power of MAHSC was combined with the adoption and diffusion machinery and expertise of the Greater Manchester Academic Health Science Network (GM-AHSN) to create an integrated academic health science and innovation system, Health Innovation Manchester.

As part of Health Innovation Manchester (HInM), MAHSC brings together the world's leading academic and NHS partners in Greater Manchester to drive health research.

MAHSC partners
Manchester Academic Health Science Centre comprises:
 The University of Manchester
 Manchester University NHS Foundation Trust
 The Christie NHS Foundation Trust
 Greater Manchester Mental Health NHS Foundation Trust
 Salford Royal NHS Foundation Trust

Research domains
The MAHSC discovery and translation strategy is delivered by six domains, each led jointly by an academic and an NHS clinician and chaired by a CEO from a partner Trust. The domains are: 
 Cancer
 Cardiovascular & Diabetes
 Inflammation & Repair
 Mental Health
 Neuroscience
 Women & Children

with cross-cutting expertise in applied health (working closely with the NIHR Applied Research Collaboration Greater Manchester), digital health, and precision medicine.

Crucially, research projects undertaken via MAHSC and Greater Manchester’s other research bodies are pulled through HInM’s innovation pipeline to provide a pathway of evidence-based innovations that can be deployed at pace and scale.

History
The creation of Manchester Academic Health Science Centre was announced by the then health secretary Alan Johnson in March 2009.

The designation was renewed by the Department of Health and Social Care from April 2014 for 5 years, with a one year extension then granted to March 2020.

The most recent designation is from April 2020 to March 2025.

See also 
 Health Innovation Manchester
 Healthcare in Greater Manchester

References

External links 
 https://healthinnovationmanchester.com/, the website of Manchester Academic Health Science Centre

Health in Greater Manchester
Innovation in the United Kingdom
Medical education in England
Academic health science centres
2008 establishments in England
University of Manchester